Khorramabad (also Romanized as Khorramābād; also known as Khormābād) is a village in Baranduz Rural District, in the Central District of Urmia County, West Azerbaijan Province, Iran. At the 2006 census, its population was 253, in 62 families.

References 

Populated places in Urmia County